Günter Voglmayr (21 February 1968 – 11 January 2012) was an Austrian classical flutist.

Life 
Born in Ried im Innkreis, Voglmayr got his first flute lessons at the age of 8, from 1978 with Helmut Trawöger at the Landesmusikschule Grieskirchen and 4 years later he studied with Wolfgang Schulz at the University of Music and Performing Arts Vienna.

Voglmayr was a prizewinner at the national competition  and a participant in the Eurovision competition Eurovision Young Musicians in Copenhagen.

In 1987 he was first flutist of the Gustav Mahler Jugendorchester under Claudio Abbado and Franz Welser-Möst as well as with the stage orchestra of the Austrian Federal Theatres. In 1993 Voglmayr took up the position of flautist at the Vienna State Opera. In 1996 he became a member of the Vienna Philharmonic as successor to Herbert Reznicek.

He was founder and until 2004 director of the Burg Rappottenstein festival.

Discography 
 2010: Dedicated to Piccolo. Günter Voglmayr (piccolo), Stefan Mendl (clavier), Camerata Records.
 2012: Neue Musik für Flöte und Blasorchester. Günter Voglmayr (flute), SBO Ried – Sinfonietta, Karl Geroldinger (conductor), ORF Ö1 CD.

Further reading

References

External links 
 

Players of the Vienna Philharmonic
Austrian classical flautists
20th-century classical musicians
1968 births
2012 deaths
People from Upper Austria
20th-century flautists